Donato is an Italian given name and surname. Notable people with the surname include:

 Andy Donato (born 1937), editorial cartoonist for the Toronto Sun
 Baldassare Donato (1525–1603), Italian composer of the Venetian school
 Daniel Donato, graduate student whose research was at the center of the 2006 Biscuit Fire publication controversy
 Dick Donato (born 1963), American television personality and winner of Big Brother 8
 Eugenio Donato (1937–1983), Armenian-Italian deconstructionist and literary critic
 Fiorenza Donato (born 1971), Italian physicist
 James Donato (born 1960), judge of the U.S. District Court for the Northern District of California
 Magda Donato (1898–1966), Spanish-Mexican writer and actress
 Marc Donato (born 1989), Canadian actor
 Pietro di Donato (1911–1992), American writer and bricklayer
 Pietro Donato (1380–1447), a Renaissance humanist and the Bishop of Padua (from 1428)
 Ryan Donato (born 1996), NHL player
 Ted Donato (born 1969), retired NHL player

See also
Donato (disambiguation)

References

Italian-language surnames